Salisbury Mills is a hamlet and census-designated place (CDP) in the towns of Blooming Grove and Cornwall in Orange County, New York, United States. As of the 2020 census, it had a population of 580.

The CDP is in eastern Orange County and is bordered to the north by Beaver Dam Lake. Salisbury Mills is built along Moodna Creek, which flows east into the Hudson River between New Windsor and Cornwall-on-Hudson. The Moodna Viaduct, the longest actively used rail trestle in the eastern United States, crosses Moodna Creek at the eastern edge of the CDP.

New York State Route 94 forms the northern edge of the CDP. It leads northeast  to New Windsor and southwest  to Chester.

Demographics

References 

Census-designated places in Orange County, New York
Census-designated places in New York (state)